Siborongborong is a district (kecamatan) in the North Tapanuli regency, North Sumatra province, Sumatra, Indonesia.

Transportation
Siborong-Borong has an airport, Silangit Airport.

Districts of North Sumatra